The SNCF Class BB 900 was a class of 35 mixed-traffic electric locomotives built between 1936 and 1937 for État.  The class was a development of the pre-war Midi Class E4700 and very similar to the later Class BB 300 and Class BB 325. Initial use was on the Paris–Le Mans line. The class was withdrawn in 1987 after 50 years in service.

History

Context 
In the early 1930s, the economic crisis hit and the government undertook major works to support employment, known as the Marquet plan. It was in this context that the decision was made to electrify the line from Paris-Montparnasse to Brest, between Paris and Le Mans. In anticipation of the completion of this work, the State company ordered two series of electric locomotives: the Class 2D2 5400 for the passenger services and the BB 900 for freight trains.

The BB 900 were a development of the Midi E 4200 and E 4700 classes. The Midi company had a long experience in electric traction and the BB Midi were very successful. Compared to their predecessors, the new locomotives had different gear ratios, the profile of the line being less hilly than that of the lines of the South. Likewise, they were not fitted with rheostatic braking, being less useful on the plain.

Service 
The class was ordered by État from Alsthom in 1934. The class was originally numbered BB 101–BB 135. Upon delivery, from 1936 to 1937, the class was assigned to the Montrouge depot. Their main duties were operating heavy freight services on the newly electrified Paris-Le Mans line. Some passenger trains are also operated by these locomotives, at the head of Talbot trainsets. A BB 900 at the head of a  train could match the running of a Somua Z 3800 railcar. During the tests a speed of  would have been sustained.

One locomotive was a casualty of the Second World War. BB 125 was destroyed in July 1944 in the air attack on the Maintenon viaduct by the USAAF.

In the SNCF renumbering scheme of 1950, the class was renumbering BB 901–BB 935, omitting BB 925.

During the 1960s the class underwent major overhauls. Shortly after, some members of the class were transferred to the depot in Limoges, with the remainder following around 1975.

The modernisation of the SNCF electric fleet entailed the gradual withdrawal of the class from 1982 to 1987.

Technology 
The technology used was the same as that proven on the Midi machines, with an increase in power compared to the BB 4700. As with their predecessors, the bogies are linked together and include shock devices.

The body was made of welded steel, integrated with the frame. It had two driving cabins. The traction motors were nose suspended: on one side, the motor rests on the central cross member of the bogie supported by helical springs, on the other side it rests on the axle to be driven. The engine/bogie transmission is bilateral, as with all the other BB Midi, with a ratio of 3.273.

Unlike the Midi BB 4700, these locomotives did not have rheostatic electric braking which was deemed unnecessary on the Paris - Le Mans line.

The motors were controlled by means of a 29-notch controller, wired as follows:
 0: open circuit
 1 to 10: series operation, on starting resistors
 11: direct series operation
 12 to 18: series-parallel, on resistors
 19: direct series-parallel
 20 to 27: parallel, on resistors
 28: full field parallel
In addition to this controller, the driver also had a shunt lever with 6 positions allowing "reduced field" operation and a direction switch.
The current collection was by two Faiveley pantographs. The high voltage circuit consisted of a double disconnect switch and a circuit breaker. The motors were coupled via a battery of electro-pneumatic contactors.

During the general overhaul, the end doors were removed and the engine control and electrical wiring completely refurbished.

Fleet list

References

Bibliography 
 
 

900
B-B locomotives
BB 900
Standard gauge locomotives of France